The Dancer (German: Der Tänzer) is a 1919 German silent film directed by Carl Froelich and starring Lil Dagover.

Cast
In alphabetical order
 Irmgard Bern 
 Theodor Burghardt 
 Lil Dagover 
 Maria Forescu
 Hugo Froelich
 Walter Janssen as Der Tänzer  
 Ria Jende 
 Adolf Klein
 Klein-Meinhardt 
 Eugen Klöpfer 
 Margarete Kupfer 
 Aenderly Lebius 
 Ena Mar 
 Frida Richard 
 Margarete Schön 
 Gertrude Welcker

References

Bibliography
 Hans-Michael Bock and Tim Bergfelder. The Concise Cinegraph: An Encyclopedia of German Cinema. Berghahn Books.

External links

1919 films
Films of the Weimar Republic
Films directed by Carl Froelich
German silent feature films
German black-and-white films
1910s German films